Madison Hope Headrick is an American fashion model.

Early life and career
Headrick was born in North Carolina, and lived primarily in Charleston, South Carolina. She graduated early before becoming a model at 16.

Headrick debuted as a Prada exclusive, including the campaign shot by Steven Meisel. Headrick has also done campaigns for Calvin Klein.

She has appeared in advertisements for Polo Ralph Lauren, Vera Wang, Max Mara, Rag & Bone, Zuhair Murad, Hugo Boss, Acne Studios, 
Balmain, and Neiman Marcus. Headrick has appeared in Vogue Paris (as well as on the May 2019 supplement cover), Vogue, Harper's Bazaar, Vogue Latin America, Vogue Spain,  Playboy and Issue.

References 

1993 births
Living people
People from Charlotte, North Carolina
People from Charleston, South Carolina
Female models from North Carolina
Female models from South Carolina
The Lions (agency) models
Elite Model Management models
Prada exclusive models
21st-century American women